Benard Nkanjo (born September 28, 1970) is a Zimbabwean sculptor.

Born in the Highfield area of Harare, Nkanjo would visit his relative Garrison Machinjili while he was in school.  Machinjili was a sculptor, and Nkanjo studied with him for three years before leaving to work on his own.  Currently he lives and works in Chitungwiza.

Nkanjo's stone of choice for carving is serpentinite.

References
 Biographical sketch

1970 births
Living people
People from Harare
20th-century Zimbabwean sculptors
21st-century Zimbabwean sculptors